The Invercargill Golf Club is a golf club in Southland, New Zealand, located on Dunns Road in Otatara, near Invercargill. In 1960 Invercargill Golf Club hosted the New Zealand Open which was won by Peter Thomson. It is also the permanent hosts of the SBS Invitational.

External links
Invercargill Golf Club Website

Golf clubs and courses in New Zealand
Sport in Invercargill
Sports venues in Invercargill
Organisations based in Invercargill